Charles Phillip Richard Moth (born 8 July 1958) is a British Roman Catholic prelate. Since May 2015, he has served as the Bishop of Arundel and Brighton. Previously, he was Vicar General of the Archdiocese of Southwark from 2001 to 2009, and the Bishop of the Forces from 2009 to 2015.

Early life
Charles Phillip Richard Moth was born in 1958 in Chingola, Northern Rhodesia (now Zambia), and immigrated to the United Kingdom at the age of two. He was educated at The Judd School in Tonbridge, Kent. He trained for the priesthood at St John's Seminary, Wonersh.

Ordained ministry

Priesthood
Moth was ordained to the priesthood (Catholic Church) on 3 July 1982. He served as Curate at St Bede's, Clapham Park and as a judge at the Southwark Metropolitan Tribunal before being sent to do further study in Ottawa, gaining a Licentiate and then a Master's in Canon Law. In 1987 he returned to Southwark and was curate at St Saviour's, Lewisham, during which appointment he was also a Territorial Army chaplain, serving with 217 General Hospital RAMC (V).

In 1992, Archbishop Michael Bowen named him as his Private Secretary, serving concurrently as Vocations Director and Vice-Chancellor of the Diocese. Moth was named a Monsignor to the degree of Papal Chaplain in 1998. In 2001, upon the elevation of the Vicar General, Mgr Canon John Hine, to be an Auxiliary Bishop of Southwark, Moth was named Vicar General and Chancellor of the Archdiocese, with the new post he was promoted to be a Prelate of Honour.

Episcopate
In July 2009, Moth was appointed Bishop of the Forces by Pope Benedict XVI. He stepped down as Vicar General of Southwark and was succeeded by Mgr. Matthew Dickens in September 2009. He was consecrated bishop on 29 September 2009, the Feast of the Archangels Michael, Gabriel and Raphael, in Westminster Cathedral. Archbishop Kevin McDonald was principal consecrator, with Archbishop Michael Bowen and Bishop Tom Burns as principal co-consecrators. Archbishop Vincent Nichols and Cardinals Cormac Murphy-O'Connor and Keith O'Brien were present in choir. His time as Bishop of the Forces ended in 2015 when he was translated to a different see.

On 21 March 2015, Moth was announced as the next Bishop of Arundel and Brighton, having been appointed by Pope Francis. He was installed on 28 May 2015.

References

Bibliography
Bishop-elect Richard Moth. Archdiocese of Southwark. Retrieved 12 September 2009.
Charles Phillip Richard Moth. Catholic Hierarchy. Retrieved 12 September 2009.
New Bishop of the Forces. Catholic Church in England and Wales. Retrieved 12 September 2009.
Bishop Richard Moth. Catholic Church in England and Wales. Retrieved 12 September 2009.

External links

1958 births
Living people
Roman Catholic bishops of Arundel and Brighton
Roman Catholic bishops of the Forces
21st-century Roman Catholic bishops in England
Royal Army Chaplains' Department officers
English Roman Catholic bishops